The Main Cycleway is a major German bicycle path running for about 600 km along the River Main in Germany. It starts from either Creußen or Bischofsgrün and ends in Mainz.  The General German Bicycle Club (ADFC) rated the trail five stars in 2008, the first path in Germany to receive this award. Approximately 90% of the path is paved and 77% of the route is at least 2.5 metres wide.

Trail itinerary
From east to west (generally), the cycleway passes through the many notable places shown below (with UNESCO World Heritage Sites listed):
Bischofsgrün (starting point on the White Main)
Bad Berneck im Fichtelgebirge (From the former station west of Bischofsgrün to here, the trail follows the river on a former railway path)
Himmelkron
Trebgast
Creußen (starting point on the Red Main)
Weidenberg
Bayreuth
Margravial Opera House
Neuenmarkt
Kulmbach (White and Red Main unite)
Burgkunstadt/Altenkunstadt
Michelau
Lichtenfels
Bad Staffelstein
Bamberg
Bamberg Altstadt
Zeil am Main
Haßfurt
Schweinfurt
Volkach
Kitzingen
Ochsenfurt
Würzburg
Würzburg Residence
Karlstadt am Main
Gemünden am Main
Lohr am Main
Rothenfels
Marktheidenfeld
Urphar
Wertheim am Main
Miltenberg
Aschaffenburg
Seligenstadt
Frankfurt am Main
Mainz

Connections with other major cycling paths
 Rheinradweg between Mainz-Kostheim and Mainz-Kastel
 Hessischer Radfernweg R3 between Rheinmündung and Hanau
 Hessischer Radfernweg R4 in Maintal (Rumpenheim—Bischofsheim Ferry)
 Hessischer Radfernweg R6 in Mainz Kostheim (Mainbrücke)
 Hessischer Radfernweg R8 in Frankfurt-Höchst (Mainbrücke)
 Deutscher Limes-Radweg between Großkrotzenburg and Miltenberg
 Kahltal-Spessart-Radwanderweg
 Main-Werra-Radweg
 Taubertalradweg
 Wern-Radweg
 Saale-Radweg

River and its culture

The River Main is the force behind it all: magnificent churches, imposing castles, poets and musicians, famous museums, and a unique lifestyle. Franconia and the Hessian Lower Main Region are influenced by the river and make this area a treasure trove for travellers looking to experience culture.

Three of the cultural highlights along the Main are the cities of Würzburg, Bamberg and Bayreuth. They are listed as UNESCO World Heritage Sites. In Würzburg, the honour goes to the Residenz Castle, the former residence of the city’s prince-bishops. The castle was built and furnished between 1720 and 1780 and is regarded as one of the most important castles in all of Europe. The grand staircase with the single largest ceiling fresco in the world is the most unusual part of the castle. In Bamberg, the entire old town is a world heritage. Founded over 1.000 years ago, the city combines the magic of the Middle Ages and the Baroque era. Nowhere else in Germany can a better preserved and more congruent downtown be found. The Imperial Cathedral, the New Residence, the Town Hall, the Alte Hofhaltung Estate, and half-timbered architecture provide a journey through the centuries. In Bayreuth the world heritage “Margravial Opera House” is considered to be the most beautifully preserved baroque opera house in Europe. Margravine Wilhelmine commissioned one of the most famous families of theatre architects, the Bolognese, Giuseppe Galli Bibiena, and his son, Carlo, to design its interior. With a depth of 27 metres, the stage of this opera house was the largest one in Germany until 1871 - a superlative, which also drew Richard Wagner's attention to Bayreuth.

The cathedral in Bamberg is one of the most outstanding places of worship along the Main. Other great cathedrals can be found in Mainz, Würzburg, and Frankfurt. Deeply devout Christians have made the journey to Franconia’s pilgrimage churches for centuries. An especially magnificent example is the Basilica Vierzehnheiligen near the town of Bad Staffelstein. The area the basilica is located in has been labelled by poets as "God’s Garden along the Upper Main River".
Poets have been busy practising one of the "beautiful arts" along the Main for centuries. In 1749, the renowned German poet Johann Wolfgang von Goethe was born in Frankfurt am Main. The city honours its famous son with the Goethe House and the Goethe Museum. In 1785, Jacob Grimm and a year later his brother, Wilhelm Grimm, were born in the town of Hanau. They are known worldwide as the Brothers Grimm, famous for their fairy tales.

The Main is also closely related to music, just as Bayreuth is related to Richard Wagner. Every year, music lovers flock to Bayreuth for the annual Richard Wagner Music Festival. But there is more to music along the Main: Different varieties of music can be enjoyed at the "Old Opera House" in Frankfurt am Main, in the Baroque-era "Margravial Opera House" in Bayreuth, in parks, castles, and courtyards all along the river.

Franconia and the Hessian Lower Main Region are also rich in castles and fortresses. In times gone by, Germany consisted of many petty states, principalities and counties. Each individual ruler tried to impress by building magnificent structures. Many superb examples of their attempts to outdo one another are found along the river. There are the Isenburg Castle in Offenbach, the Johannisburg Castle in Aschaffenburg, the New Castle in Bayreuth, the Plassenburg Castle in Kulmbach, and the Marienberg Fortress in Würzburg. Many of the most imposing structures along the Main now house a wide variety of museums and exhibits. There are State Galleries in Aschaffenburg, Bamberg, Kulmbach, and Bayreuth featuring many works by famous artists. The Museum Georg Schäfer in Schweinfurt has a wonderful collection of 19th century German art. In Bayreuth a lot of modern art can be found. Gambling is also possible along the Main: the Wiesbaden Casino is located in the beautiful, historical resort facility. Of great European significance are the museums along the riverfront in Frankfurt: Here sculptures, architecture, movies, and art – all can be found in one place.

Publications
 bikeline-Radtourenbuch Main-Radweg, 1:75.000, Verlag Esterbauer, Rodingersdorf, 2000, in German.
 BVA Kompaktspiralo Main-Radweg, 1:75.000, Bielefelder Verlag, Bielefeld, 2011, in German.
 Radwanderkarte Main-Radweg 1 – Creußen/Ochsenkopf—Würzburg, 1:50,000, Publicpress-Verlag, Geseke, 2006, in German.
 Radwanderkarte Main-Radweg 2 – Würzburg—Mainz, 1:50.000, Publicpress-Verlag, Geseke, 2007, in German.

References

External links
 
Map of Main Cycleway 
Main-Radweg Tourist Guidebook 

Cycling in Germany
Cycleways in Germany